"Maybe I Should" is the first single I Am Kloot released after parting ways with their former record label Echo. The songs were recorded during the autumn of 2005. The single was released on 21 November 2005 by Skinny Dog label, co-founded by I Am Kloot's bass player, Peter Jobson, and Elbow's lead vocalist, Guy Garvey. The music was produced by Guy Garvey and Craig Potter.

The single reached #128 on the UK Singles Chart.

Track listing
All songs written by John Harold Arnold Bramwell.

 "Maybe I Should" – 3:08
 "Strange Little Girl" – 2:15

References 

2005 singles
I Am Kloot songs
2005 songs